Swing, Swang, Swingin is an album by American saxophonist Jackie McLean recorded in 1959 and released on the Blue Note label. It features McLean in a quartet with pianist Walter Davis Jr., bassist Jimmy Garrison and drummer Art Taylor.

Reception
The AllMusic review by Steve Huey stated "Perhaps as a result of Blue Note's more prepared, professional approach to recording sessions, McLean sounds invigorated here, catapulting each melody forward before launching into a series of impassioned improvisations... Swing, Swang, Swingin may not be as groundbreaking as McLean's more modernist work, but it's a solid session from an artist just beginning an incredible hot streak".

Track listing
All compositions by Jackie McLean, except as indicated
 "What's New?" (Burke, Haggart) - 5:19
 "Let's Face the Music and Dance" (Berlin) - 4:51
 "Stablemates" (Golson) - 5:47
 "I Remember You" (Mercer, Victor Schertzinger) - 5:16
 "I Love You" (Porter) - 5:10
 "I'll Take Romance" (Oscar Hammerstein II, Oakland) - 5:49
 "116th and Lenox" - 6:01

Personnel
Jackie McLean - alto saxophone
Walter Bishop Jr. - piano
Jimmy Garrison - bass
Art Taylor - drums

References

1960 albums
Blue Note Records albums
Jackie McLean albums
Albums produced by Alfred Lion
Albums recorded at Van Gelder Studio